List of geological features on Mercury is an itemization of mountains, valleys, craters and other landform features of the planet Mercury. Different types of features are named after different things: Mercurian ridges are called dorsa, and are named after astronomers who made detailed studies of the planet; valleys are called valles, and are named after ancient abandoned cities, towns, and settlements; crater chains are called catenae and are named after radio telescope facilities; plains are called planitiae, and most are named after mythological names associated with Mercury; escarpments are called rupes and are named after the ships of famous explorers; long, narrow depressions are called fossae and are named after works of architecture; bright spots are called faculae and are named after the word snake in various languages.

See also list of craters on Mercury, list of albedo features on Mercury, and list of quadrangles on Mercury

Longitude is west longitude.

List of geological features on Mercury

References

 Batson R.M., Russell J.F. (1994), Gazetteer of Planetary Nomenclature, United States Geological Survey Bulletin 2129 

Mercury
Mercury (planet)-related lists